Behrendt is a German surname. Notable people with the surname include: 
 Brian Behrendt (born 1991), German footballer
 Dagmar Roth-Behrendt (born 1953), German Member of the European Parliament, lawyer
 Gerhard Behrendt (1929–2006), German  film director, puppet  designer
 Greg Behrendt (born 1963), American stand-up comedian
 Holger Behrendt (born 1964), German  gymnast
 Jan Behrendt (born 1967), German luger
 Jutta Behrendt (born 1960), German  competition rower
 Kerstin Behrendt (born 1967), German athlete
 Klaus J. Behrendt (born 1960), German  actor
 Larissa Behrendt (born 1969), Aboriginal Australian academic and writer
 Lars Behrendt (born 1973), German  bobsledder
 Richard Fritz Behrendt (1908–1973), German sociologist
 Walter Behrendt (1914–1997), German politician
 Walter Curt Behrendt (1884–1945), German-American architect
 Wolfgang Behrendt (born 1936), German amateur  boxer

See also
 Berendt (disambiguation)
 Berend
 Wacław Berent

German-language surnames
Surnames from given names